Sam's Town Hotel and Gambling Hall is a casino brand. It may also refer to specific properties of the brand:

 Sam's Town Hotel and Gambling Hall, Las Vegas – operating in Sunrise Manor, Nevada, since 1979
 Sam's Town Hotel and Gambling Hall, Shreveport – operating in Shreveport, Louisiana, since 2004
 Sam's Town Hotel and Gambling Hall, Tunica – operating in Tunica Resorts, Mississippi, since 1994
 Sam's Town Gambling Hall, Kansas City – operated in Kansas City, Missouri, from 1995 to 1998
 Sam's Town Gold River – operated in Laughlin, Nevada, from 1984 to 1991; now Laughlin River Lodge

See also
 Sam's Town 250, a NASCAR Craftsman Truck Series race held at Las Vegas Motor Speedway in 1998
 Sam's Town 250, a NASCAR Busch Series race held at Memphis International Raceway from 1999 to 2007
 Sam's Town 300, a NASCAR Busch Series race held at Las Vegas Motor Speedway from 1998 to 2013
 Sam's Town 400, a NASCAR Craftsman Truck Series race held at Texas Motor Speedway from 2006 to 2008